is a passenger railway station located in the city of Naruto, Tokushima Prefecture, Japan. It is operated by JR Shikoku and has the station number "N06".

Lines
Only local services stop at the station.

Layout
Konpiramae Station, which is unstaffed, consists of a side platform serving a single track. There is no station building, only a shelter on the platform. The platform is at the same level as the access road and may be entered without the need for a ramp or steps.

History
Konpiramae Station was opened by the privately run Awa Electric Railway (later the Awa Railway) on 1 July 1916 as Konpiramae stop. After the Awa Railway was nationalized on 1 July 1933, Japanese Government Railways (JGR) took over control of Konpiramae, upgraded it to a full station and operated it as part of the Awa Line. On 20 March 1935, after some other stations on the line were absorbed into the Kōtoku Main Line, Kyōkaimae became part of the Muya Line. On 1 March 1956, the line was renamed the Naruto Line. On 1 April 1987, with the privatization of Japanese National Railways (JNR), the successor of JGR, the station came under the control of JR Shikoku.

Passenger statistics
In fiscal 2019, the station was used by an average of 70 passengers daily

Surrounding area
 Konpira Jinja
Japan National Route 11

See also
 List of Railway Stations in Japan

References

External links

 JR Shikoku timetable

Railway stations in Tokushima Prefecture
Railway stations in Japan opened in 1916
Naruto, Tokushima